The 2004 California Golden Bears football team was an American football team that represented the University of California, Berkeley in the Pacific-10 Conference (Pac-10) during the 2004 NCAA Division I-A football season. In their third year under head coach Jeff Tedford, the Golden Bears compiled a 10–2 record (7–1 against Pac-10 opponents), finished in second place in the Pac-10, and outscored their opponents by a combined score of 441 to 192.

The Golden Bears were ranked No. 4 at the end of the regular season, its only loss having been  USC by a 23–17 score. In that game, quarterback Aaron Rodgers set a school record for consecutive completed passes with 26 and tied an NCAA record with 23 consecutive passes completed in one game. He set a Cal single-game record for passing completion percentage of 85.3. Rodgers' performance set up the Golden Bears at first and goal with 1:47 remaining and a chance for the game-winning touchdown. On the first play of USC's goal-line stand, Rodgers threw an incomplete pass. This was followed by a second-down sack by Manuel Wright. After a timeout and Rodgers' incomplete pass on third down, USC stopped Cal's run play to win the game. Rodgers commented that it was "frustrating that we couldn't get the job done."

After Texas was picked over Cal for a Rose Bowl berth, the fourth-ranked Bears were awarded a spot in the Holiday Bowl, which they lost to Texas Tech, 45–31. 

The team's statistical leaders included Aaron Rodgers with 2,566 passing yards, J. J. Arrington with 2,018 rushing yards, and Geoff McArthur with 862 receiving yards. Three California players received first-team honors on the 2004 College Football All-America Team: running back J. J. Arrington (AP, FWAA, TSN, SI, ESPN, CBS); offensive lineman Marvin Phillip (SI); and defensive lineman Ryan Riddle (TSN, SI).

After the season, Rodgers decided to forgo his senior season to enter the 2005 NFL Draft. He was drafted in the first round by the Green Bay Packers.

Schedule

Roster and Coaching Staff

Game summaries

at Air Force

New Mexico State

at Oregon State

at No. 1 USC (College Gameday)

UCLA (Rivalry)

at Arizona

No. 20 Arizona State

Oregon

at Washington

Stanford (The Big Game)

Source:

at Southern Miss

vs. No. 20 Texas Tech (2004 Holiday Bowl)

See also
BCS controversies, which includes Texas receiving the Rose Bowl bid over Cal

References

California
California Golden Bears football seasons
California Golden Bears football